Vernonanthura nudiflora is a species of perennial plant in the family Asteraceae. It is native to Brazil and Argentina.

References 

nudiflora
Flora of Argentina
Flora of Brazil